Joseph Anthony Dudek (born January 22, 1964) is a former American football player.

Dudek received national attention when he was featured on the cover of Sports Illustrated's December 2, 1985, issue as the magazine's pick for the Heisman Trophy after he broke Walter Payton's NCAA record for career touchdowns.  Dudek finished ninth in the voting, the best result ever for a non-Division I player.

Dudek finished his collegiate career with ten school records. He holds the NCAA record for career 100-yard rushing games (30) and games with two or more touchdowns (24). Plymouth State went 37–6 during his time there, reaching the Eastern College Athletic Conference playoffs twice and earning their first-ever NCAA playoff appearance. To this date, his jersey is the only one that Plymouth State has retired.

Dudek played two games for the Denver Broncos in 1987 (during the 1987 NFL players' strike), rushing for 154 yards and two touchdowns.

Dudek was elected to the College Football Hall of Fame in 1997. He lives in Auburn, New Hampshire, with his wife and their two children, working for Southern Wine & Spirits.

His son, Joey, plays ice hockey at Boston College and was drafted 152nd overall in the 2014 NHL Entry Draft by the New Jersey Devils.

References

1964 births
Living people
American football running backs
College Football Hall of Fame inductees
Denver Broncos players
North Quincy High School alumni
People from Auburn, New Hampshire
Plymouth State Panthers football players
Sportspeople from Quincy, Massachusetts
Sportspeople from Rockingham County, New Hampshire
National Football League replacement players